Theta Capricorni, Latinized from θ Capricorni, is a white-hued star in the southern constellation of Capricornus, positioned 0.58° south of the ecliptic. Sometimes, this star is called by the name Dorsum, meaning the back (of the goat) in Latin. It can be seen with the naked eye, having an apparent visual magnitude of +4.07. Based upon an annual parallax shift of 20.11 mas as seen from the Earth, the star is about 162 light years from the Sun. It is drifting closer with a radial velocity of −11 km/s.

This is an ordinary A-type main sequence star with a stellar classification of A1 V. Radial velocity variations indicate it may be a binary star system, but when the system was examined in the infrared, no companion was detected. Theta Capricorni has an estimated 2.24 times the mass of the Sun and around 2.7 times the Sun's radius. It is 152 million years old and is spinning fairly rapidly with a projected rotational velocity of 104 km/s. The star is radiating 65 times the solar luminosity from its photosphere at an effective temperature of around 10,000 K.

Night viewing
The star or star system is almost eclipsed by the sun on about 3 February, when it will figure behind the sun's corona if there is a full solar eclipse. Thus the star can be viewed the whole night, crossing the sky, in early August (in the current epoch).

Chinese name

References

A-type main-sequence stars
Binary stars
Capricorni, Theta
Capricornus (constellation)
Durchmusterung objects
Capricorni, 23
200761
104139
8075